Jobim is a crater on Mercury. Its name was adopted by the International Astronomical Union (IAU) on September 25, 2015. Jobim is named for the Brazilian composer Antônio Carlos Jobim.

Jobim is one of 110 peak ring basins on Mercury.

References

Impact craters on Mercury